The 2014–15 Kategoria e Parë is being competed between 20 teams in 2 groups, A and B, respectively.

Changes from last season

Team changes

From Kategoria e Parë
Promoted to Kategoria Superiore:
 Elbasani
 Apolonia

Relegated to Kategoria e Dytë:
 Albpetrol
 Himara

To Kategoria e Parë
Relegated from Kategoria Superiore:
 Bylis
 Lushnja
 Kastrioti
 Besa

Promoted from Kategoria e Dytë:
 Iliria
 Besëlidhja
 Sopoti
 Naftëtari

Stadia by capacity and locations

Group A

Group B

League table

Group A

Group B

Final

Relegation play-offs
Besa Kavajë as the 9th–placed Group A side faced the 2nd–placed 2014–15 Kategoria e Dytë Group A side at the Niko Dovana Stadium in Durrës. Tomori Berat as the 9th–placed Group B side faced the 2nd–placed 2014–15 Kategoria e Dytë Group B side at the Qemal Stafa Stadium in Tiranë.

Season statistics

Scoring

Top scorers

Foreign players

References

2014-15
2
2014–15 in European second tier association football leagues